Tinsley Tavern, also known as Tinsleyville Tavern, is a historic inn and tavern located near Columbia in Goochland County, Virginia. It was built about 1802, and is a two-story, vernacular Federal period building.  It has a center passage plan, and features wood-frame construction with weatherboard cladding.  A -story, rear addition dates to about 1920.  The building was used as a drover's tavern until 1836, after which it was occupied as a single family home.

It was listed on the National Register of Historic Places in 2007.

References

Drinking establishments on the National Register of Historic Places in Virginia
Federal architecture in Virginia
Commercial buildings completed in 1802
Buildings and structures in Goochland County, Virginia
National Register of Historic Places in Goochland County, Virginia